Gharana is a 1989 Indian Bollywood film produced and directed by K. Ravi Shankar. It stars Rishi Kapoor, Govinda, Jaya Prada, Meenakshi Seshadri and Neelam Kothari in pivotal roles.

Cast

 Rishi Kapoor as Vijay Mehra
 Govinda as Ravi Mehra
 Meenakshi Seshadri as Radha
 Jaya Prada as Naina
 Neelam as Lalita
 Tanuja as Laxmi Mehra
 Shreeram Lagoo as Prem Mehra 
 Satyendra Kapoor as Rahim
 Shakti Kapoor as Durlabh
 Prem Chopra as Dharamdas
 Asrani as Natwar 
 Aruna Irani as Natwar's Assistant
 Sushma Seth as Shraddha
 Dara Singh as Vijay Singh Pahelwan
 Yunus Parvez as Sinha (potential in-laws of Mehras)
 Shekhar Suman as Ajit Sinha
 Bharat Bhushan as Radha's father
 Ramesh Deo as Munshi of Prem Mehra
 Bob Christo as Sheikh Diamond Merchant
 Mac Mohan as Durlabh Henchman

Plot
Prem Mehra is a wealthy, kind-hearted, and generous man who lives in a palatial home with his wife, Laxmi, a daughter, and two sons, Vijay and Ravi. Dharamdas is an foe of Prem, and he involves gangster and an employee of Prem's (accountant) to steal some priceless diamonds from his safe, thereby implicating Prem in the theft, and making him lose all his wealth and estate. Prem and his family re-locate to live with their devoted and loyal employee, Rahim. Vijay gets a job as a news-reporter, while Ravi continues with his studies. Prem's daughter's marriage is on the rocks as he now cannot afford to pay the dowry sum of seven lakhs rupees. Prem has a stroke that leaves his paralyzed. Radha is Vijay's co-worker, both fall in love with seek their respective families' blessings so that they can marry. But before they can get married, Vijay suddenly breaks all ties with Radha and instead marries Naina, the only daughter of Shraddha, his boss, thus making it clear to his family and Radha that he has married a girl for wealth. But will Naina and her mother accept Vijay as he is - greedy. And to make matters even worse Ravi wants to marry Lalita - who is none other than Dharamdas' daughter.

Music

References

External links

1980s Hindi-language films
1989 films
Films scored by Laxmikant–Pyarelal
Films directed by K. Ravi Shankar